Mutterbach is a river of Hesse and Bavaria, Germany.

The Mutterbach springs south of the districts Breitenbrunn and Haingrund of Lützelbach. It is a left tributary of the Main in Wörth am Main.

See also
List of rivers of Hesse
List of rivers of Bavaria

References

Rivers of Hesse
Rivers of Bavaria
Rivers of Germany